The 2010–11 season was FC Sheriff Tiraspol's 14th season, and their 13th in the Divizia Naţională, the top-flight of Moldovan football.

Squad

Out on loan

Transfer

In

Out

Loans in

Loans out

Released

Competitions

Divizia Națională

Results summary

Results

League table

Moldovan Cup

UEFA Champions League

Qualifying rounds

UEFA Europa League

Group stage

Squad statistics

Appearances and goals

|-
|colspan="14"|Players away on loan :

|-
|colspan="14"|Players who left Sheriff Tiraspol during the season:

|}

Goal scorers

Disciplinary record

Notes
Note 1: BATE played their group matches in Minsk at Dinamo Stadium as BATE's Haradski Stadium did not meet UEFA criteria.
Note 2: Played in Tirana at Qemal Stafa Stadium as Dinamo Tirana's Selman Stërmasi Stadium did not meet UEFA criteria.

References

External links 
 

FC Sheriff Tiraspol seasons
Moldovan football clubs 2010–11 season